An Icelandic Odyssey is a two-part concept album series by Norwegian avant-garde metal band Solefald. The first part, Red for Fire, was released on 18 October 2005, while the second part, Black for Death, was released on 24 November 2006. The band was quoted as saying "Solefald was experimenting when everybody was being true. Now that things are changing and that we've pushed the experiment quite far already, we wanted Red for Fire plus Black for Death to be our attempts at being 'true'. This will be a true Nordic Viking metal album."

Both albums could be considered a play on how Solefald describe their music, which is as "red music with black edges".

Track listing

Red for Fire 

 "Sun I Call" – 6:19
 "Survival of the Outlaw" – 6:37
 "Where Birds Have Never Been" – 5:5
 "Bragi (Instrumental)" – 1:18
 "White Frost Queen" – 6:57
 "There Is Need" – 5:53
 "Prayer of a Son (Poem)" – 1:47
 "Crater of the Valkyries" – 8:21
 "Sea I Called" – 5:34
 "Lokasenna" – 5:39

Black for Death 

All tracks written by Cornelius and Lazare.

 "Red for Fire + Black for Death" – 3:55
 "Queen in the Bay of Smoke" – 5:34
 "Silver Dwarf" – 3:23
 "Underworld (Instrumental)" – 1:15
 "Necrodyssey" – 3:47
 "Allfathers" – 5:56
 "Lokasenna Part 2" – 4:29
 "Loki Trickster God" – 5:50
 "Spoken to the End of All (Poem)" – 2:05
 "Dark Waves Dying (Instrumental)" - 3:55
 "Lokasenna Part 3" – 4:47
 "Sagateller" – 5:45

The music in the song "Loki Trickster God" is the same as in "White Frost Queen" from Red for Fire; however, "Loki Trickster God" is shorter, and the music is arranged differently in the second half of the song.

Personnel

Solefald 

 Cornelius – vocals, guitar, samples
 Lazare – vocals, keyboards, drums

Guest musicians

Red for Fire 

 Aggie Frost Peterson – vocals on "Sun I Call" and "White Frost Queen"
 Sareeta – violin on all tracks except "There Is Need" and "Lokasenna"
 Live Julianne Kostøl – cello on all tracks except "There Is Need", "Prayer of a Son (Poem)" and "Lokasenna"
 Kjetil Selvik – saxophone on "Sun I Call"
 Jörmundur Ingi Hansen – vocals on "Lokasenna"

Black for Death 

 Kristoffer Rygg – vocals on "Loki Trickster God"
 Aggie Frost Peterson – vocals on "Loki Trickster God"
 Sareeta – violin on  tracks 1, 2, 6, 8, 9, 10 and 12
 Live Julianne Kostøl – cello on tracks 1, 2, 6, 8, 9 and 12
 Kjetil Selvik – saxophone on "Underworld" and "Dark Waves Dying"
 Jörmundur Ingi Hansen – vocals on "Lokasenna" compositions

References 

2005 albums
2006 albums
Concept album series
Solefald albums
Season of Mist albums